Andrew John Bichel (born 27 August 1970) is a former Australian cricketer, who played 19 Test matches and 67 One Day Internationals for Australia between 1997 and 2004. He was a right-arm medium-fast bowler, but was also a hard-hitting lower-order batsman.

Bichel represented Queensland in the Australian domestic competitions. He also played for Worcestershire, Hampshire and Essex in English county cricket.

Since retiring from playing, Bichel has been a coach and a selector. He is a cousin of Chris Sabburg.

Personal life
Born to parents of German ancestry, Bichel married Dion in 1997 and they have two children.

Domestic career
As well as Queensland's state team, he has played for the English Counties Essex, Hampshire and Worcestershire, where he had successful sessions on Essex with the bat and ball.

International career

Early years
Bichel made his Test debut for the Australian Cricket Team in Adelaide in 1996 in a match against the West Indies, and his One-day International Debut in Brisbane, also against the West Indies.

His rise to prominence coincided with the appearance of a young Brett Lee, with whom he was often in a battle for a third fast-bowler spot in the lineup behind Glenn McGrath and Jason Gillespie holding the other two positions. As the younger and pacier Lee was often selected ahead of him, Bichel now holds the test match record of being twelfth man for Australia on 19 occasions. He has recently made comments that he believes his bowling suffered during these times, as he missed out on the valuable match practice that he could have earned either playing for Australia or Queensland.

2003 Cricket World Cup 
A highlight of Bichel's career was Australia's 2003 World Cup campaign. He was initially back up to Jason Gillespie, Brett Lee and Glenn McGrath. He played his first game against Netherlands making a good impression with the ball and after injury had ended Gillespie's World Cup campaign he took over his position in the side. Bichel retrieved Australia from serious trouble on more than one occasion, most notably his 7–20 against England. This bowling performance rated as the best bowling against England in ODIs, best bowling at St George's Park in ODIs, and his best bowling in World Cups as well.

In the same match, he went on to play a crucial role with Michael Bevan to score an unbeaten 73-run 9th wicket partnership to ease Australia to victory which saw him hit 34 not out. In the Super Six stage, he came in against New Zealand at 84–7. He and Michael Bevan again saved Australia with his highest score of 64 as Australia put up a winning total batting first. In the semi-final against Sri Lanka, he bowled tightly conceding 0–18 in 10 overs but his pressure caused the spectacular run out of Aravinda de Silva as he picked up spun around and threw down the stumps to prevent a tight single off his own bowling. In the final against India, he picked up one wicket bowling Rahul Dravid as Australia won, completing an undefeated campaign.

Injury and retirement 
At the start of the 2004–05 Australian summer, Bichel was not offered a contract by the Australian Cricket Board, an indication that the Board did not believe he would represent Australia in that season. His performances in the domestic competition, however, continued to be at the same high standards as before and it was clear that he wanted to make another return to the international scene. Bichel's performances at State level during the 2004–05 domestic season earned him the Domestic Player of the Year award at the 2005 Australian cricket awards.

However, he announced his retirement on 9 February 2009, saying he never fully recovered from his shoulder injury.

Post retirement
Chennai Super Kings, the IPL Champions of 2010 season, acquired Andy Bichel's services as a bowling coach for the team's youngsters for IPL 2011 season. He was later the coach of Papua New Guinea. On 11 November 2011, it was announced that Andy Bichel would join the Cricket Australia selection panel.

In 2014 it was announced that Bichel had partnered Tangalooma Island Resort to be an official brand ambassador.

Bichel has been well credited for his art in the fast bowling coaching landscape. His mantra of 'FTOO' is preached throughout Queensland Cricket.

References

External links
 Andy Bichel Official Website
 

Australia One Day International cricketers
Australia Test cricketers
Queensland cricketers
Worcestershire cricketers
Essex cricketers
Hampshire cricketers
Cricketers from Queensland
1970 births
Living people
Commonwealth Games silver medallists for Australia
Australian cricketers
Indian Premier League coaches
Australian cricket coaches
Commonwealth Games medallists in cricket
Cricketers at the 2003 Cricket World Cup
Cricketers at the 1998 Commonwealth Games
Australian people of German descent
Australia national cricket team selectors
Coaches of the Papua New Guinea national cricket team
Medallists at the 1998 Commonwealth Games